Sukavich Rangsitpol (born 5 December 1935) is a Thai education reformer, senator, business executive and politician. He served as deputy prime minister (1994, 1996–97) and minister of education (1995–97) of Thailand.

In 1995, as minister of education, Rangsitpol laid out his plan for education reform in Thailand to realize the potential of Thai people by developing themselves for a better quality of life and to develop the nation for a peaceful co-existence in the global community.
The reform was a landmark movement after nearly 100 years of education under the present system.

Life and career

Rangsitpol completed a bachelor's degree in political science at Thammasat University in 1960 and the Management Development Program of Asian Institute of Management, Manila in 1976. He started working as a sales representative for Caltex Oil Thailand in 1961, being promoted to sales supervisor, district manager, general sales manager and general manager over the following decades. He finally served as chairman and managing director of that company during the early 1990s.

Rangsitpol was Senator in 1987, National Legislative Assembly in 1991, and Senator Thai Senate in 1992.

Between 1993 and 1994 he was the governor of the Expressway and Rapid Transit Authority of Thailand (ETA).

In 1994, Rangsitpol joined the New Aspiration Party (NAP) of retired general Chavalit Yongchaiyudh and was appointed deputy prime minister in Chuan Leekpai's cabinet in October of the same year. Together with Chamlong Srimuang and transport minister Vichit Surapongchai he formed a team to tackle Bangkok's traffic problems. However, he lost that position after a few weeks. Sukavich was appointed minister of education in Banharn Silpa-archa's cabinet in July 1995. In addition, he was the secretary-general of the NAP from 1995 to 1997. He was alleged to have contributed 100 million baht to the party's campaign fund.

Rangsitpol as Minister of Education launched a series of education reforms in 1995. The aim was to enhance the quality of education from 1995 to achieve educational excellence by 2007.

He was elected to the House of Representatives in 1996, representing Bangkok's 13th constituency. After New Aspiration's electoral victory, Sukavich again was a deputy prime minister in Chavalit Yongchaiyudh's cabinet in addition to his post as Minister of Education. Moreover, he served as Southeast Asian Ministers of Education Organization (SEAMEO) 

Rangsitpol also lost the deputy premiership in November 1997 when Chavalit was ousted by a no-confidence vote during the Asian financial crisis.

After the election in 2001,Thaksin Shinawatra the leader of Thai Rak Thai Party, became prime minister. The New Aspiration Party has joined the government. Shortly thereafter. The New Aspiration Partywas merged with the Thai Rak Thai Party. Mostly to join Thai Rak Thai party (the governing party) with Gen. Chavalit Yongchaiyudh except Chalerm Yubamrung who return to be the Leader of the Mass Party Chingchai Mongkoltham decided to continue the New Aspiration Party and Lieutenant Colonel Thita Rangsitpol Manitkul, WRTA Member of the Parliament and Deputy Secretary of the party. Offset to the Democrats. (Opposition Party) remains the only MPs moving from the opposition party government. During her tenure as a member of the House of Representatives. 

In 2005, he was re-elected once again, this time a representative of the TRT party list. As one of 111 executive members of the TRT, he was banned from political activities for five years after the 2006 coup d'état. He expressed no wish to return to politics after the ban expired.

Awards and recognitions 
 1995 Thailand Education Reform
 1996 "During his trip to the Philippines, H.E. Mr Sukavich Rangsitpol was conferred an Honorary Degree of Doctor of Education by the Philippine Normal University. His will to reform education and strong leadership in educational management were highly commended."
 1997 ACEID awards for excellence in education
 1998 Educational innovation and information

References

1935 births
Living people
Chevron Corporation people
Sukavich Rangsitpol
Sukavich Rangsitpol
Sukavich Rangsitpol
Sukavich Rangsitpol
Sukavich Rangsitpol
Sukavich Rangsitpol
Sukavich Rangsitpol